The 1934 Mississippi College Choctaws football team was an American football team that represented Mississippi College as a member of the Dixie Conference and the Southern Intercollegiate Athletic Association (SIAA) in the 1934 college football season. Led by Stanley L. Robinson in his 11th season as head coach, the team compiled an overall record of 5–4 and with a mark of 2–2 in Dixie Conference play and 4–2 against SIAA competition.

Schedule

References

Mississippi College
Mississippi College
Mississippi College Choctaws football seasons
Mississippi College Choctaws football